Mon amour (French "my love") may refer to:

Entertainment and the arts

Film and television 
Monamour, 2006 Italian film
Mon Amour: Shesher Kobita Revisited, 2008 Bengali film

Music 
"Mon Amour" (BZN song), 1976
"Mon Amour" (Klaus Dinger song), 1985
"Mon amour", 2004 song by Elsa
"Mon amour", a song by Shakira from She Wolf
"Mon Amour" (Zzoilo song), 2020
"Mon amour" (Stromae and Camila Cabello song) 2022

See also
"Dors, mon amour", winning song in the Eurovision Song Contest 1958 by André Claveau
Hiroshima mon amour, 1959 film